

Biography
He studied at Sacred Heart College, Auckland. In Fiji, he studied at the Marist Brothers High School.

He started his career in 1993 as a journalist with the Fiji Broadcasting Corporation Limited (formerly Radio Fiji). He is also a former Fiji TV employee and TV Journalist. He was the first local reporter when Fiji TV started Fiji One News in April 1994. He resigned from Fiji TV in 2001.

References

People from Suva
Living people
People educated at Sacred Heart College, Auckland
University of the South Pacific alumni
Fijian businesspeople
People educated at Marist Brothers High School, Fiji
Fijian people of British descent
Year of birth missing (living people)